opened in Takasaki, Gunma Prefecture, Japan, in 1979.

See also
 List of Historic Sites of Japan (Gunma)
 The Museum of Modern Art, Gunma
 List of Cultural Properties of Japan - paintings (Gunma)
 List of National Treasures of Japan (archaeological materials)

References

External links
  Gunma Prefectural Museum of History

Museums in Gunma Prefecture
Prefectural museums
Museums established in 1979
1979 establishments in Japan
Takasaki, Gunma
History museums in Japan